Chestnut Street Incident is the debut studio album by John Mellencamp, then known as "Johnny Cougar," released in 1976.

Signing on with David Bowie's manager, Tony Defries, Mellencamp travelled to New York City to cut this first album. DeFries would also go on to produce the album as well. With the thinking that a name like "Mellencamp" wouldn't generate a lot of interest, DeFries changed Mellencamp's name to "Johnny Cougar." Mellencamp would later go on to say that he had no idea about the name change until he saw the final product and that nobody had ever called him "Johnny" before. It would take Mellencamp 15 years to have his full real name on an album, Whenever We Wanted, in 1991.

With five of the tracks covers from the '50s and '60s, only six are original songs by Mellencamp. The 1998 Original Masters rerelease added two bonus songs that were also covers. The album only sold 12,000 copies when it was originally released, which would lead to MCA's refusal to release his next album, The Kid Inside, and drop Mellencamp.

The 2009 CD reissue by Cherry Red Records added six bonus tracks recorded during the original album sessions.

Track listing
All tracks composed by Johnny Cougar (a.k.a. John Mellencamp); except where indicated

 "American Dream" – 2:21
 "Oh, Pretty Woman" (Bill Dees, Roy Orbison) – 2:54
 "Jailhouse Rock" (Jerry Leiber and Mike Stoller) – 2:11
 "Dream Killing Town" (Cougar, George M. Green) – 3:20
 "Supergirl" (Aldo Legui, Bob Marcus) – 2:37
 "Chestnut Street" – 3:18
 "Good Girls" – 3:09
 "Do You Believe in Magic?" (John Sebastian) – 2:38
 "Twentieth Century Fox" (John Densmore, Robby Krieger, Ray Manzarek, Jim Morrison) – 2:14
 "Chestnut Street Revisited" – 5:22
 "Sad Lady" (Cougar, George M. Green) – 3:26

1998 CD bonus tracks
 "Hit the Road Jack" (Percy Mayfield) – 2:32
 "I Need Somebody Baby" (Iggy Pop, James Williamson) – 3:43

2009 CD bonus tracks
 "Man Who Sold the World" (David Bowie) - 2:28
 "Little Heroes" - 2:47
 "Hit the Road Jack" (Percy Mayfield) - 2:32
 "Kicks" (Barry Mann, Cynthia Weil)- 2:35
 "Need Somebody Baby" (Iggy Pop, James Williamson) - 3:43
 "When I Was Young" - 2:38

Personnel
 John Mellencamp – vocals, guitar
 Mike Boyer, Richard Kelly, Mick Ronson, Mike Wanchic – guitars
 David Mansfield – steel guitar, mandolin, violin
 Michael Kamen – keyboards
 Tom Wince – keyboards, chimes
 Kirk Butler – synthesizer, percussion, engineer
 David Parman - bass, guitar, backing vocals
 Wayne Hall – saxophone
 Bill Bergman, Jerome Deupree, Hilly Michaels – drums
Technical
 Tony Defries - producer
 James J. C. Andrews - co-producer
 Bruce Tergesen - engineer

References

Online resources

External links
 

John Mellencamp albums
1976 debut albums
MCA Records albums
Covers albums
Albums produced by Tony Defries